The year 2022 is the 29th year in the history of the K-1, an international kickboxing event. The year started with K-1 World GP 2022 Japan.

List of events

K-1 World GP 2022 Japan

K-1 World GP 2022 Japan will be a kickboxing event held by K-1, which will be held on February 27, 2022, at the Tokyo Metropolitan Gymnasium in Tokyo, Japan.

Background
A K-1 Women's Flyweight Championship bout between reigning champion Kana Morimoto and title challenger Kotomi was expected to take place at the event. Kotomi later withdrew, and was replace by Ran, who faced Morimoto in a non-title bout.

K-1 Lightweight Champion Taio Asahisa was scheduled to face Yuki Yoza in a non-title bout.

A Super Bantamweight World Grand Prix is expected to take place during the event. The tournament was organized to fill the vacant K-1 Super Bantamweight title.

Reigning Krush Super Lightweight champion Daizo Sasaki was scheduled to face Vitor Toffanelli.

K-1 Japan Super Bantamweight Tournament bracket

Fight Card

K-1: K'Festa 5

K-1: K'Festa 5 will be a kickboxing event held by K-1, which will be held on April 3, 2022, at the Yoyogi National Gymnasium in Tokyo, Japan.

Background
An openweight tournament was held during the event. It featured the former K-1 cruiserweight champion K-Jee, the former K-1 heavyweight champion Kyotaro Fujimoto, current Krush cruiserweight champion Mahmoud Sattari, as well as Hidenori Sakamoto, Kosuke Jitsukata, Satoshi Ishii, Animal Koji and Seiya Tanigawa.

A K-1 Super Lightweight Championship bout between the reigning titleholder Hideaki Yamazaki and title challenger Tetsuya Yamato was scheduled for the event.

K1 Featherweight champion Taito Gunji was booked to face Toma Tanabe in a non-title bout.

K-1 Japan Openweight Tournament bracket

Fight Card

THE MATCH 2022

The Match 2022 will be a kickboxing event held as a partnership with K-1 and RISE on June 19, 2022, in Tokyo, Japan.

Background
The main event will feature the megafight between the RISE Featherweight champion Tenshin Nasukawa and the K-1 Super Featherweight champion Takeru Segawa.

Fight Card

K-1: Ring of Venus

K-1: Ring of Venus will be a kickboxing event held by K-1, which will be held on June 25, 2022, at the Yoyogi National Gymnasium in Tokyo, Japan.

Background
Multiple-time Shootboxing tournament winner Mio Tsumura is booked to face Phayahong Ayothayafightgym in the semifinals of the K-1 atomweight Grand Prix. The second atomweight bout pits the reigning Krush atomweight champion Miyuu Sugawara against Kira Matsutani.

Kana Morimoto, Mako Yamada and Miho Takanashi are scheduled to participate in a Japan versus the world matchups, where they will face international opponents.

Fight Card

K-1 World GP 2022 in Fukuoka

K-1 World GP 2022 in Fukuoka will be a kickboxing event held by K-1, which will be held on August 11, 2022, at the Fukuoka Convention Center in Fukuoka, Japan.

Background
A Featherweight World Grand Prix was held during the event, featuring Jawsuayai Sor.Dechaphan, Shuhei Kumura, Taito Gunji, Facu Suarez, Tatsuya Tsubakihara, Toma Tanabe, Takahito Niimi and Wang Junguang.

K-1 World Featherweight Tournament bracket

Fight Card

K-1 World GP 2022 Yokohamatsuri

K-1 World GP 2022 Yokohamatsuri will be a kickboxing event held by K-1 on September 11, 2022, at the Yokohama Arena in Yokohama, Japan.

Background
The K-1 World Super Featherweight World Grand Prix was held at the event, which featured the following fighters: Tatsuya Oiwa, Adam Bouarourou, Leona Pettas, Hirotaka Asahisa, Nakrob Fairtex, Tomoya Yokoyama and Bailey Sugden. Naoki Yamamoto faced Narufumi Nishimoto in the reserve bout. Sugden withdrew from the tournament, due to an injury, on August 3. He was replaced by Stavros Exakoustidis.

A K-1 World GP Super Lightweight Championship bout between the champion Tetsuya Yamato and challenger Daizo Sasaki took place at the event.

K-1 World Super Featherweight Tournament bracket

Fight Card

K-1 World GP 2022 in Osaka

K-1 World GP 2022 in Osaka will be a kickboxing event held by K-1 on December 3, 2022, at the Edion Arena Osaka in Osaka, Japan.

Background

K-1 World Bantamweight Tournament bracket

Fight Card

See also
 2022 in Glory  
 2022 in ONE Championship
 2022 in Romanian kickboxing
 2022 in Wu Lin Feng

References

External links
Official website

2022 sport-related lists
K-1 events
2022 in kickboxing
2022 in Japanese sport